Cătălin Marcel Cursaru (born 29 March 1978) is a retired Romanian footballer.

Over the course of seven Liga I seasons, Cursaru amassed totals of 167 games and 51 goals.

Club career
Born in Ploieşti, Prahova, Cursaru came through the youth ranks of local Astra Ploieşti, going on to finish his sporting formation with the Divizia C team Chimia Brazi. After one season in Divizia C, he made his Divizia A debut in 2000–01, against Steaua on 7 August 2000 (scoring twice in the process).

FCM Bacău
On 26 January 2000, he signed for FCM Bacău, but he played no matches, because he was a dispute subject between Bacău and his former club Astra. The striker was eligible to play, starting August 2000, and soon after he scored his first two goals in his Liga I debut. He finished his first top flight season with 15 goals.

In his second season, he partnered Cristian Ciocoiu, and he netted 17 goals (competition best) but his reference point, was when he scored a scissor kick against Dinamo, and his goal was selected "Play of the Day" by CNN. At the end of the season, media reported that German side Hertha Berlin offered $1,800,000, but Sechelariu asked $300,000 more, and the negotiations collapsed. To not be criticised by Cursaru, Sechelariu raised his player's wage up to $10,000 per month. However, after the transfer failure, the player never regained his form and confidence. In the next three years, he produced only 17 goals, in 75 matches. In 2003, he impressed in a trial for the Norwegian side SK Brann, but once again, Sechelariu's demands, made the transaction collapsing.

In total, Cursaru scored 49 goals in the shirt of FCM Bacău in five seasons, leaving the club in July 2005 after he refused to extend his contract.

Rest of career
Cursaru signed a two-year contract with Divizia A side SC Vaslui on 11 October 2005, but he ultimately failed to impress, scoring none during the season, in which Vaslui eventually remained in the top flight. He released his contract in late April. Following the unsuccessful spell in Vaslui, in June 2006 he signed with FC Naţional. He played for a year and a half for the "Bankers", but ultimately he was released following his low goal-per-match rate. Following two unsuccessful attempts to revive himself in the lower divisions, for Aerostar Bacău and Tricolorul Breaza, and without any offer for almost a year, he officially retired in mid-2011 from professional football.

Club statistics

Statistics accurate as of match played 15 October 2009

Honours

Individual
Topscorer of Romanian First League: 2002.

References

External links
 

1978 births
Living people
Sportspeople from Ploiești
Romanian footballers
FCM Bacău players
FC Vaslui players
FC Progresul București players
CS Aerostar Bacău players
Association football forwards